"As Soon as I Hang Up the Phone" is a song written by American country artist Conway Twitty, and recorded by Twitty  and Loretta Lynn as a duet. It was released in 1974 as the first single from the album Country Partners. It was the fourth number one on the U.S. country singles chart for the pair as a duo. The single went to number one for a single week and spent 11 weeks on the chart. It also reached number 1 in South Africa, spending 16 weeks on the chart.

Content
The song - depicting a woman trying to maintain a crumbling relationship, but who soon realises is ending - is a rare spoken word/sung duet. Lynn provides the sung vocals while Twitty performs the spoken part. The song was actually recorded with Twitty in another room on the telephone to Lynn in the recording booth.

Chart performance

References

1974 singles
Conway Twitty songs
Loretta Lynn songs
Songs written by Conway Twitty
Song recordings produced by Owen Bradley
Male–female vocal duets
MCA Records singles
1974 songs